HD 181433 b is an extrasolar planet located approximately 87 light years away in the constellation of Pavo, orbiting the star HD 181433. This planet has mass at least 7.56 times that of Earth. This planet is classified as a super-Earth and orbits at 0.080 AU and varies only about 0.063 AU with an eccentricity of 0.396. François Bouchy et al. have published a paper detailing the HD 181433 planetary system in Astronomy and Astrophysics.

References

External links 
 

HD 181433
Pavo (constellation)
Super-Earths
Exoplanets discovered in 2008
Terrestrial planets
Exoplanets detected by radial velocity